Grande Hermine ("great ermine") was the name of the carrack that brought Jacques Cartier to Saint-Pierre on 15 June 1535, and upon which he discovered the estuary of the St. Lawrence River and the St. Lawrence Iroquoian settlement of Stadacona (near current-day Quebec City). She is believed to be represented in the local flag of Saint Pierre and Miquelon (the yellow ship). It is also featured on the Amory Adventure Award of Canadian Scouting. La Grande Hermine was the second ship Jacques Cartier used when exploring the St. Lawrence River

Replicas

A life-size wooden replica of the vessel was featured at the Expo 67 in Montreal (1967) where she served as a floating restaurant. Following the Expo the replica was moved to Quebec City and put on static display in an artificial pond located in a city park, where she remained for at least three decades; poorly maintained. She was broken up in the same park where she sat for years.

Another unrelated replica, possibly based on the steel hull of a 1914 ferry or a 1941 icebreaker, was purchased by a businessman with the intention of moving her to Ontario and re-opening the restaurant, however, he did not have the funds to realize this, and the ship sits in Jordan Harbour, unused. In 2003, the ship was destroyed by what police called a suspicious fire, most likely the work of arsonists. The burned-out hull still sits in the harbor, located between the 55- and 57-kilometer markers on the Queen Elizabeth Way.

As of 2022,  the 4 masts have been removed due to unsafe conditions and years of deterioration, with the entirety of the ship being removed sometime in the future.

References

two articles (in French) about the Expo 67 Grande Hermine replica:
1
2

pictures of the replica ship at Expo 67:
1
2
3
4

pictures of the replica ship arriving in Quebec City:
1
2

Notes

 History of Saint Pierre and Miquelon
 Age of Discovery ships